Bholanath Vidyapitha is a government educational institution imparting education in high school level. The school was established in 1960 in the holy city of Puri, located near Abakash lane near Shree Gundicha Temple. Palishree mela is being observed every year during Puri, Rath Yatra time.

The activities present here are NCC, Red Cross, Scouts and Guides.

References

Gallery

Schools in Odisha
Puri
1960 establishments in Orissa
Educational institutions established in 1960